Warnock may refer to:

People
Warnock (surname), for people with the surname
Raphael Warnock (born 1969), United States Senator from Georgia

Other uses
 Warnock Building, listed on the National Register of Historic Places in Woodbury County, Iowa
 Warnock's dilemma, interpretations of a lack of response to online postings
 Warnock algorithm in computer graphics
 Warnock (typeface), a serif typeface
 Warnock, Ohio
 Warnock Islands